River Grove (or Rivergrove) is a neighborhood within the city limits of Tampa, Florida. It along with Woodland Terrace and Live Oaks Square are commonly referred to by residents as Comanche, a name derived from a street that goes through the neighborhoods. As of the 2000 census the neighborhood had a population of 949. The ZIP Codes serving the neighborhood are 33604 and 33610.

Geography
River Grove boundaries are Hillsborough River to the north, Woodland Terrace to the south, 30th Street to the west, and Northeast Community to the east.

Demographics
Source: Hillsborough County Atlas

As of the census of 2010, there were 901 people living in the neighborhood. The population density was 5,020/mi2. The racial makeup of the neighborhood was 12% White, 84% African American, 0% Native American,  0% Asian, 1% from other races, and 2% from two or more races. Hispanic or Latino of any race were 12% of the population.

There were 369 households, out of which 34% had children under the age of 18 living with them, 33% were married couples living together, 30% had a female householder with no husband present, and 1% were non-families. 31% of all households were made up of individuals.

In the neighborhood the population was spread out, with 29% under the age of 18, 20% from 18 to 34, 20% from 35 to 49, 16% from 50 to 64, and 16% who were 65 years of age or older. For every 100 females, there were 73.6 males.

The per capita income for the neighborhood was $15,568. About 18% of the population were below the poverty line, 28% of those under age 18.

See also
Neighborhoods in Tampa, Florida

References

External links
River Grove Civic Association

Neighborhoods in Tampa, Florida